The Compostela Group of Universities (CGU) is an international non-profit association that promotes and executes collaboration projects between institutions of higher education. It currently has 67 full members, 2 associate members and 9 mutual membership agreements with institutions from 27 different countries.

History 

In 1993, the University of Santiago de Compostela began initiating contact with other institutions in higher education situated along the Way of St. James,  to establish a university network for collaboration and to help helped to preserve the cultural and historical heritage that emerged along the ancient pilgrim route.

Following these initial developments, 57 European universities met in Santiago from 2–4 September 1993. They established the guidelines and  objectives of the group. These included the following three, which are still the objectives of today's CGU:

 Strengthening the channels of communication between the member universities.
 Organizing events to study and discuss subjects related to Europe.
 Promoting mobility as the basis to increase the knowledge of European languages and cultures.

A commission consisting of representatives from the universities of Valladolid, Liège, Nantes, Göttingen, Minho, Jaume I and Santiago de Compostela drew up the Statutes of the Compostela Group of Universities. These were officially adopted at the first Constituent Assembly, held at the University of Santiago de Compostela from 2–3 September 1994.

Organization

Structure 
The Compostela Group of Universities is headquartered in Santiago de Compostela, Spain and has a regional office in Brussels, Belgium.

The organizations current president is Marek Kręglewski.

Activities

Compostela Prize 

In 1996, the CGU and the Regional Ministry of Culture, Social Communication and Tourism signed an agreement to establish the Compostela Prize (International Prize Grupo Compostela-Xunta de Galicia).

The prize is awarded annually and seeks to reward "[...] any individual or institution that have contributed to the promotion of the European dimension in education, either in teaching  and research or in the cultural, social and political fields [...]." Nominations can be made by CGU member universities, members of the Xunta de Galicia and other official European institutions until the 1st of March each year.

The jury consists of the President of the Galician Government, who chairs the meetings, and the Regional Minister of Culture, the Regional Minister of Education and Universities and the Galician Director of Universities. The Compostela Group is represented by its President and three rectors of member universities, chosen annually by the General Council.

The prize is usually awarded at the end of the General Assembly of the Compostela Group of Universities, with the successful candidate receiving prize money and a commemorative gold medal in the shape of a shell (the centuries-old symbol of the pilgrimage to Santiago).

Recent recipients are:

 2018: María Pilar Alonso Abad, Art history professor at the University of Burgos (UBU), for her academic work and unique research on the Jacobean cultural heritage
 2017: Marcelino Oreja Aguirre, Spanish Minister of Foreign Affairs, for his efforts in designating the Saint James Way as the Council of Europe's first cultural route.
2016: CIRCOM Regional, European Association of Regional Television, for the networks support in promoting European diversity and regional development.

Members 
The Compostela Group of Universities has the following members, as of 2021:

Belarus
 Yanka Kupala State University of Grodno

Brazil
 São Paulo State University

China
 Zhejiang Wanli University

Czech Republic
 Masaryk University

Dominican Republic
 Santo Domingo Institute of Technology

France
 University of Nantes

Georgia
 Grigol Robakidze University
 Ilia State University

Germany
 Philipps University of Marburg
 University of Regensburg

Hungary
 University of Pécs

Indonesia
 University of Surabaya

Italy
 Kore University of Enna
 Università telematica internazionale Uninettuno

Lithuania
 Kazimieras Simonavičius University

Malta
 University of Malta

Mexico
 Centro de Enseñanza Técnica y Superior
 Monterrey Institute of Technology and Higher Education
 Universidad Anáhuac Xalapa (Anahuac University Network)
 Universidad La Salle México
 University of Guadalajara
 University of Monterrey

Panama
 Columbus University

Peru
 ESAN University
 National University of San Marcos
 Federico Villarreal National University
 Peruvian University of Applied Sciences
 Pontifical Catholic University of Peru
 University of Lima
 University of Piura

Poland
 Adam Mickiewicz University in Poznań
 University of Łódź

Portugal
 University of Minho
 University of Trás-os-Montes and Alto Douro

Serbia
 University Business Academy in Novi Sad

Slovakia
 Pan-European University

Spain
 Jaume I University
 King Juan Carlos University
 Technical University of Madrid
 Universidad Politécnica de Cartagena
 University of A Coruña
 University of Almería
 University of Burgos
 University of Cádiz
 University of Extremadura
 University of La Laguna
 University of Las Palmas de Gran Canaria
 University of León
 University of Lleida
 University of Málaga
 University of Oviedo
 University of Salamanca
 University of Santiago de Compostela
 University of Seville
 University of the Basque Country
 University of Valencia
 University of Vigo
 University of Zaragoza

Sweden
 Karlstad University

Switzerland
 University of Fribourg

United Kingdom
 University of Worcester

Associate members
Greece
 Metropolitan College (AMC)

Collaborators
Brazil
 FAUBAI - Brazilian Association for International Education

Russia
 EEUA - Eastern European University Association

Slovenia
 Euro-Mediterranean University of Slovenia

Spain
 Erasmus Compostela

United Kingdom
 Quacquarelli Symonds

United States
 Consortium for North American Higher Education Collaboration
 HACU - Hispanic Association of Colleges and Universities
 Scholars at Risk

See also 
 National Institutes of Technology, 31 leading public engineering universities in India

References

External links
 

1994 establishments in Spain
College and university associations and consortia in Europe
Educational organisations based in Spain
International college and university associations and consortia
Organizations established in 1994